Masters of Illusion is the eponymous debut album of American hip hop group Masters of Illusion, composed of producer KutMasta Kurt and rappers Kool Keith & Motion Man. It was released on November 14, 2000, via Threshold Records. The project features no guest emcees, but does feature DJ cuts/scratches by DJ Revolution, DJ Babu and DJ Rhettmatic.

Some CD releases also come with a free instrumental version of the album, as is typical with Kool Keith releases (Dr. Octagonecologyst, First Come, First Served, etc.)

Track listing

Notes
Tracks 3, 5, 8, 12 and 14 featured DJ cuts by DJ Revolution
Track 7 featured DJ cuts by DJ Rhettmatic
Track 16 featured DJ cuts by DJ Babu

Personnel
Kurt Matlin – lyrics, producer, mixing, arranging, executive producer
Keith Matthew Thornton – lyrics (tracks: 1-3, 5-11, 13-19), vocals
Paul K. Laster – lyrics (tracks: 1-4, 6-12, 14-19), vocals
Kurt G. Hoffman – scratches/cuts (tracks: 3, 5, 8, 12, 14)
Nazareth Nirza – scratches/cuts (track 7)
Melvin Babu – scratches/cuts (track 16)
Scott Zuschin – voice (track 1)
Ken Lee – mastering
Jim Rasfeld – layout
James Reitano – artwork

References

External links 

2000 albums
Kool Keith albums